Bauder is a surname. Notable people with the surname include:

Christopher Bauder (born 1973), German interaction designer and media artist 
Emma Pow Bauder (1848-1932), American evangelist and author
Eugen Bauder (born 1986), German model and actor
Kevin T. Bauder, American Baptist theologian
Matt Bauder (born 1976), American jazz saxophonist, clarinetist and composer

Surnames from nicknames
German-language surnames